The 2017 FIBA 3x3 U18 World Cup, which was hosted by China, was an international 3x3 basketball event that featured separate competitions for men's and women's under-18 national teams. The tournament was held in Chengdu in front of the New Century Global Center. It was co-organized by the FIBA.

Participating teams
The FIBA 3x3 Federation Ranking was used as basis to determine the participating FIBA member associations.

Men

Women

References

External links
Official website

 
2017
2017 in 3x3 basketball
Sport in Chengdu
International basketball competitions hosted by China
2017–18 in Chinese basketball
June 2017 sports events in Asia
July 2017 sports events in Asia